The Townley Antinous is a marble portrait head of the Greek youth Antinous, the boyfriend or lover of the Roman Emperor Hadrian, wearing an ivy wreath. It is now part of the collection of London's British Museum, and was  part of the Townley Marbles. The portrait probably shows the youth as Dionysus–Bacchus. The bust was acquired along with the rest of the antiquities collected by 18th-century Grand Tourist and Fellow of the Royal Society, Charles Townley. A drawing of the bust attributed to Vincenzo Pacetti is also in the museum's collection.

It and the remains of the statue to which it belonged were found used as spolia in a roadside wall near the Porta San Pancrazio, a gate in the Aurelian Walls. Townley bought the head in July 1773 from Thomas Jenkins, the antiquary and art dealer, for £150. The head was already in Britain by June 1774, probably having been owned previously by John Sackville, 3rd Duke of Dorset, from whom Jenkins wrote in July 1773 that it was "to be received".

See also
Antinous Farnese
Antinous Mondragone
Capitoline Antinous
Statue of Antinous (Delphi)
 Townley Hadrian

References

External links
 

Busts in the United Kingdom
Sculptures of Antinous
Sculptures of men in the United Kingdom
Antinuous